The Blessing of the Bikes, also The Blessing of the Bicycles, is an annual tradition in which riders of motorcycles or bicycles are blessed by a priest in the hope that it will bring safety for the coming season. Many towns hold annual ceremonies to bless motorcycles at the start of the summer.

The first mass blessing of bicycles was held in 1999 at the Cathedral of St. John the Divine in New York City. Since its beginning the ceremony has been ostensibly non-denominational, focusing more on rider safety than religion. However, the service does include prayers and reading of biblical passages, and bicycles are sprinkled with holy water. A brief memorial service is held to acknowledge riders who have died in the previous year.

The popularity of the service has encouraged other localities to follow suit. Annual blessings are held from Burlington, Massachusetts to Los Angeles to Melbourne and incorporate varying degrees of emphasis on religion, environmentalism, fitness, cyclists' rights, and safety.

In 2013, Good Samaritan Hospital celebrated their 10th Annual Blessing of the Bikes in Los Angeles

See also
Blessing of the Fleet

References

External links
LA: website
NY: website
NH: website

Cycling in New York City
Culture of New York City
Cycling in Melbourne
Cycling in Los Angeles
1999 establishments in New York City
Recurring events established in 1999
Bicycling and religion